Route 19 is a long state highway in Missouri.  Its northern terminus is at U.S. Route 61 in New London and its southern terminus is at U.S. Route 63 on the north side of Thayer.  Route 19 is one of Missouri's original 1922 highways, though it initially had a northern terminus at Route 14 (now Interstate 44) in Cuba and was later extended north.

Route description
Route 19 begins at U.S. Route 61 in New London.  It then travels mainly south, forming an 8-mile concurrency with U.S. Route 54, 3 miles west of Farber.  The highway intersects Interstate 70 near New Florence.  It crosses the Missouri River on the Christopher S. Bond Bridge at Hermann.  There is a concurrency with Missouri Route 100 through Hermann.  It then forms a brief 1 mile concurrency with U.S. Route 50 at Drake.  Through Owensville there is a concurrency with Route 28.  The highway intersects Interstate 44 at Cuba.  South of Cuba, the highway is designated as a scenic highway.  It forms a concurrency with Route 8 through Steelville.  It passes through the Ozark National Scenic Riverways and portions of the Mark Twain National Forest.  The highway overlaps U.S. Route 60 in Winona and U.S. Route 160 in Alton.  The highway terminates at U.S. Route 63 in Thayer.

History
The part from Drake north to US 54 east of Mexico was Route 45 from 1922 until about 1930.

Major intersections

References

019
Transportation in Oregon County, Missouri
Transportation in Shannon County, Missouri
Transportation in Dent County, Missouri
Transportation in Crawford County, Missouri
Transportation in Gasconade County, Missouri
Transportation in Montgomery County, Missouri
Transportation in Audrain County, Missouri
Transportation in Ralls County, Missouri